Lesotho Mounted Police Service FC is a Lesotho football club based in Maseru. It is based in the city of Maseru in the Maseru District.

The team currently plays in Lesotho Premier League.

Stadium
Currently the team plays at the 1,000 capacity PTC Ground Europa.

References

External links
Soccerway

Lesotho Premier League clubs
Police association football clubs
Organisations based in Maseru